Curmont is a commune in the Haute-Marne department in north-eastern France.

Geography
The river Blaise flows through the commune.

Population

See also
Communes of the Haute-Marne department

References

Communes of Haute-Marne
Enclaves and exclaves